Bible of the Beast is the third studio album by German power metal band Powerwolf. The album was released on 24 April 2009. It was recorded at the Studio Fredman in Gothenburg, Sweden.

Powerwolf revealed the details of their third album on 25 February 2009. They revealed the album cover on 3 March 2009.

The album's single "Raise Your Fist, Evangelist" was released on 19 March 2009.

Critical reception 
 The record was able to place as the band's first album in the German charts and reached number 76.

The Metal Hammer saw Bible of the Beast as the band's best album so far. "Bible of the Beast has everything that Powerwolf excels in – hymns, pounders and humor – but without this time too much to slide into kitsch". The much more aggressive singing of singer Attila Dorn was praised. Metal.de wrote, "Bible of the Beast has become a fast, catchy metal album that will please fans of the bombastic genre in particular. Including orchestral and choral elements, of course, in large quantities". This website also praised Dorn's "extraordinarily good performance". As a listener, however, you have to "bring the necessary breeze tolerance and dark humor to really get started with this music".

The song "Raise Your Fist, Evangelist" was nominated for the Metal Hammer "Metal Anthem 2010" award.

Track listing

Personnel 
 Attila Dorn – vocals
 Matthew Greywolf – lead and rhythm guitar
 Charles Greywolf – bass, rhythm guitar
 Stéfane Funèbre – drums, percussion
 Falk Maria Schlegel – organ, keyboards

Charts

References 

2009 albums
Powerwolf albums
Albums produced by Fredrik Nordström